Sir Geoffrey Edmund Cator  (14 August 1884 – 21 April 1973) was an English diplomat mainly active in the Malayan Civil Service.

Biography

Cator was born in Lacock, Wiltshire, the son of brewer Robert Cator of Bath and Evelyn Susan Sotheron Estcourt. He married Elizabeth Margaret Wynne Mostyn in 1922; they had a son, Peter John Cator (26 October 1924 – 22 January 2006) and daughter Rosemary Ann Cator.

Sir Geoffrey joined the Malayan Civil Service in 1907 until 1939. He was the British Resident of Brunei from May 1916 until March 1921. Later he was posted as the Superintendent of Government Monopolies of Straits Settlements, the District Officer of Klang and also member of the Legislative Council of Federated Malay States. He was the British Resident of Selangor (1932-1933) and British Resident of Perak (1933-1939). His last post was the head of the Malay States Information Agency in London. He was made a Knight Bachelor in the 1946 New Year Honours. He had previously been awarded the CMG in 1936.

He died at a nursing home in Surrey.

Cator Avenue in Taiping was named after him.

Contributions
During the World War II, Sir Geoffrey also responsible for planning the war strategy, initially he published some written reviews, when Malaya was ambushed by the Japanese. His publications were,

"Malaya's war effort", Asiatic Review (1940)
"Malaya: The first year", Asiatic Review (1940)
"Course of Japanese invasion of Malaya", Crown Colonist (February 1942)
"Malaya and the Japanese attack", Asiatic Review (1942)
"Malaya: a retrospect", Asiatic Review (1942)

References

National Archive of Malaysia
Geoffrey C. Gunn, New World Hegemony in the Malay World

1884 births
1973 deaths
Administrators in British Brunei
Administrators in British Malaya
Administrators in British Borneo
Knights Bachelor
Companions of the Order of St Michael and St George
Alumni of the University of Cambridge
Colonial Administrative Service officers
British people in British Malaya